Steven D. McDonald (March 1, 1957  January 10, 2017) was a New York City Police Department patrolman who was shot and paralyzed on July 12, 1986. The shooting left him quadriplegic.

Shooting 

A former U.S. Navy hospital corpsman and third generation NYPD police officer, McDonald was shot in the line of duty by 15-year-old Shavod Jones, one of three boys he was questioning about bicycle thefts in Central Park. McDonald and a co-worker were on patrol in Central Park because there had been reports about a robbery in the park. While attempting to question Jones, McDonald noticed something in another boy's sock, and when he wanted to see what it was, Jones shot McDonald three times. The first bullet hit him in the head, above his eye; the second hit his throat and caused him to have a speaking disability; and the third shattered his spine, paralyzing him from the neck down and leaving him quadriplegic and in need of a ventilator.

Several months after he was shot, McDonald reported to the press that he had forgiven Jones for his actions. McDonald discussed the reasons for his forgiveness in some detail in the foreword of a 2014 book titled Why Forgive?, written by friend and pastor Johann Christoph Arnold.

Jones served nine years in prison for the shooting and had called McDonald to apologize, but the two never met in person after the incident. Jones was killed in a motorcycle crash on September 10, 1995, four days after his release on parole.

Personal life and death 

McDonald's wife, Patricia Ann "Patti" McDonald, was elected Mayor of Malverne on Long Island in March 2007. At the time of the shooting, they had been married for less than a year and Patti was pregnant with their son Conor, who followed his father's footsteps by joining the NYPD in 2010. Conor had attained the rank of Sergeant in the force by the time of his father's passing.

Steven McDonald died on January 10, 2017, at the age of 59, after having a heart attack a few days prior but died from his injuries. He was given a full police funeral at St. Patrick's Cathedral with Cardinal Dolan presiding over the Mass. Thousands of civilians and law enforcement officers gathered inside and outside the cathedral to pay their final respects and goodbyes, and the Mass was broadcast on the city's PIX 11 out of respect for McDonald's legacy. Phillip Phillips, winner of the eleventh season of American Idol, was invited to the wake service and performed his hit song "Home" because it was one of McDonald's favorites, according to his son, Conor.

Breaking the Cycle program 
McDonald further promoted his message of forgiveness following his shooting by founding Breaking the Cycle, a program promoting nonviolent conflict resolution. McDonald attended assemblies at high schools or middle schools and tell the students about his personal story of forgiveness. The program was started after McDonald traveled to Northern Ireland multiple times from 1997 to 1999 with his friends Mychal Judge and Johann Christoph Arnold to promote forgiveness in the wake of the conflicts there.

Following his death, McDonald's wife and son have continued working with Breaking the Cycle by telling his story of forgiveness to students.

Steven McDonald Extra Effort Award 

The New York Rangers of the National Hockey League (NHL) established the Steven McDonald Extra Effort Award in his honor following the 1987–1988 NHL season. McDonald would personally present a Ranger with a trophy and a $25,000 check (in the player's name) made out to the Steven McDonald Foundation.

References

Further reading 

 . Pocket Books, 1991.
 Why Forgive, pp 172–192. Plough Publishing, New York, 2010.
https://www.breakingthecycle.com/about 
 http://pix11.com/2017/01/10/nypd-det-steven-mcdonald-dead-at-59-lead-inspiring-life-after-1986-shooting-paralyzed-him/
 Obituary

1957 births
2017 deaths
New York City Police Department officers
New York Rangers
People with tetraplegia
Place of birth missing
United States Navy corpsmen
Military personnel from New York City
Place of death missing
American shooting survivors